The following is a list of NCAA Division I baseball career and single-season home run leaders.

Career home run leaders

Single-season home run leaders

See also

List of college baseball awards
List of Major League Baseball career home run leaders

References

Baseball records
Career home run leaders
 collegiate home runs